is a Japanese number theorist. He is professor of mathematics at Nagoya University in Nagoya, Japan.

Education and career 
Matsumoto graduated from the University of Tokyo in 1981. He got a doctoral degree from Rikkyo University in 1986, advised by Akio Fujii. His thesis was titled Discrepancy estimates for the value-distribution of the Riemann zeta-function. He became a lecturer at Iwate University in 1987 and an associate professor there in 1990. He joined Nagoya University in 1995, becoming a full professor there in 2001.

Research 
Matsumoto's specializations include number theory, zeta theory, and mathematical analysis. He is mostly recognized for the Matsumoto zeta function, a zeta function named after him. He co-edited Analytic Number Theory (2002), a book about prime numbers, divisor problems, Diophantine equations, and other topics related to analytic number theory, including Diophantine approximations, and the theory of zeta and L-functions. His other book, Algebraic And Analytic Aspects Of Zeta Functions And L-Functions, a compilation of lectures at the French-Japanese Winter School, was published in 2010.

Selected publications

References

External links
 

20th-century Japanese mathematicians
21st-century Japanese mathematicians
Number theorists
Living people
Academic staff of Nagoya University
Year of birth missing (living people)